Jeffrey Edward "Jeff" Smith (born 8 December 1935) is an English former professional footballer who made 316 appearances in the Football League playing for Sheffield United and Lincoln City.

Life and career
Smith was born in Chapeltown, Sheffield and began his football career as a junior with Sheffield United. He turned professional with that club, but played only once in the Second Division – in a 5–1 defeat to Liverpool at Anfield on 1 December 1956 – before moving on to Lincoln City, also a Second Division club, in February 1958.

He played regularly for Lincoln at left back, remaining with the club as they fell from the Second to the Fourth Division. When Lincoln were relegated to the Third Division in 1961, the Daily Mirror commented that there were "several talented players in the side – notably young inside right Roger Holmes and sound left back Jeff Smith". He was released in 1967, having scored twice from 351 games in all senior competitions, a total which at the time placed him second behind Tony Emery in Lincoln's all-time appearances list.

References

1935 births
Living people
Sportspeople from Macclesfield
English footballers
Association football fullbacks
Sheffield United F.C. players
Lincoln City F.C. players
English Football League players